The intelligent grass mouse or Patagonian akodont (Akodon iniscatus) is a species of rodent in the family Cricetidae. The species is found in Argentina and Chile.

References

Mammals of Argentina
Mammals of Chile
Akodon
Mammals described in 1919
Taxa named by Oldfield Thomas
Taxonomy articles created by Polbot